Hemichroa may refer to:
Hemichroa (plant), a genus of plants in the family Amaranthaceae
Hemichroa (sawfly), a genus of sawflies in the family Tenthredinidae